The Greater Ring or Intermediate Ring in Brussels, Belgium (French: Moyenne Ceinture, Dutch: Middenring) is a set of roads in the shape of a ring, intermediate between the Small Ring and the main Brussels Ring motorway. The greater part of this set of roads is numbered R21 and is about 30 km long, compared to 8 km for the Small Ring and 80 km for the main Ring.

It crosses two highways (A12 and E40-east) and offers a connection to the A10/E40-west at Basilique/Basiliek via Avenue Charles Quint/Keizer Karellaan, to the A12 at Gros Tilleul/Dikke Linde, to the E19-north and N22/A201 at Leopold III via Boulevard Léopold III/Leopold III-laan, to the A3/E40-east at Reyers, to the E411 at Arsena(a)l via Boulevard du Triomphe/Triomflaan and to the E19-south at Paepsem via Boulevard Industriel/Industrielaan.

This road passes through tunnels (Boileau tunnel, Montgomery tunnel, Georges Henri tunnel), on bridges and viaducts (e.g. Diamant viaduct, Teichmann bridge and Van Praet bridge) and under bridges and viaducts (e.g. Luttre bridge). Among those bridges, 7 are used to cross railroads and 2 are used to cross the Brussels–Scheldt Maritime Canal. Tunnels and the Diamant viaduct are used to avoid crossroads. The Greater Ring runs along many parks: the Royal Domain, the Josaphat park, the Forest park, the Astrid park, the Scheutbos park, the Elisabeth park, the Jeugdpark and the Laeken park. It also crosses the Bois de la Cambre.

The road goes through 14 municipalities out of the 19 which form the Brussels Capital Region: City of Brussels, Schaerbeek, Woluwe-Saint-Lambert, Woluwe-Saint-Pierre, Etterbeek, Ixelles, Uccle, Forest, Saint-Gilles (only when riding clockwise), Anderlecht, Sint-Jans-Molenbeek, Koekelberg, Ganshoren and Jette.

Crossroads
The Greater Ring counts 15 main crossroads with other main roads in Brussels. Starting from the north and going clockwise, those crossroads are:

 Gros Tilleul/Dikke Linde: where motorway A12 starts, leading to Antwerp via Willebroek
 Van Praet: crossroad with the Quai des Usines/Werkhuizenkaai (the road along the Brussels–Scheldt Maritime Canal) and the Avenue de Vilvorde/Vilvoordselaan (N1 road leading to Antwerp via Mechelen)
 Josaphat: crossroad with Avenue Chazal/Chazallaan located at the eastern end of the Josaphat park
 Meiser: crossroad with the Chaussée de Louvain/Leuvensesteenweg (N2 road) as well as the Avenue Rogier/Rogierlaan and the Avenue Eugène Plasky/Eugène Plaskylaan
 Reyers: where motorway A3, leading to E40, starts; connecting to Germany via Leuven and Liège, this is also the crossroad with Avenue de Roodebeek/Roodebeeklaan, Avenue des cerisiers/Kerselarenlaan and Avenue du Diamant/Diamantlaan; the Belgian national radios and televisions (RTBF and VRT) are also located next to this intersection
 Montgomery: crossroad with the Avenue de Tervueren/Tervurenlaan (N3 road) and the Avenue de Broqueville/De Broquevillelaan
 Arsenal/Arsenaal: crossroad with the Chaussée de Wavre (N4 road) and the Boulevard du Triomphe/Triomflaan
 Couronne/Kroon: crossroad with the Avenue de la Couronne/Kroonlaan
 La Cambre/Ter Kameren: crossroad with the Avenue Louise/Louizalaan, where the Greater Ring enters the Bois de La Cambre/Ter Kameren Bos
 Vanderkindere: crossroad with Avenue Brugmann/Brugmannlaan and rue Vanderkindere/Vanderkinderelaan
 Albert: crossroad with Chaussée d'Alsemberg/Alsembergse Steenweg
 Paepsem: crossroad with Boulevard Industriel/Industrielaan
 Dupuis: crossroad with Boulevard Sylvain Dupuis/Sylvain Dupuislaan
 Prince de Liège/Prins van Luik: crossroad with Chaussée de Ninove/Ninoofsesteenweg (N8 road) and Boulevard Prince de Liège/Prins van Luiklaan
 Basilique/Basiliek: crossroad with Boulevard Leopold II/Leopold II Laan next to the Basilica

Road names
The roads that form the Greater Ring are the following, starting from the Gros Tilleul/Dikke Linde crossroad and going clockwise:
 Avenue Van Praet/Van Praetlaan (going southeast) and Avenue des Croix du Feu/Vuurkruisenlaan (going northwest)
 Boulevard Lambermont/Lambermontlaan
 Boulevard Général Wahis/Generaal Wahislaan
 Boulevard Auguste Reyers/Auguste Reyerslaan
 Boulevard Brand Whitlock/Brand Whitlocklaan
 Boulevard Saint-Michel/Sint-Michielslaan
 Boulevard Louis Schmidt/Louis Schmidtlaan
 Boulevard Général Jacques/Generaal Jacqueslaan
 Avenue du Congo/Congolaan
 Avenue Lloyd George/Lloyd Georgelaan
 Avenue de Flore/Floralaan
 Avenue de Diane/Dianalaan
 Avenue de la Lisière
 Avenue Winston Churchill/Winston Churchilllaan
 Avenue Albert/Albertlaan
 Avenue Besme/Besmelaan and then Avenue Reine Marie-Henriette/Koningin Maria-Hendrikalaan (going northwest) or Avenue des Villas and then Avenue du Mont Kemmel (going southeast)
 Avenue Wielemans Ceuppens/Wielemans Ceuppenslaan
 Avenue du Pont de Luttre/Luttrebruglaan
 Rue du Charroi/Gerijstraat
 Boulevard Paepsem/Paepsemlaan
 Avenue Frans Van Kalken/Frans Van Kalkenlaan

At this point the Greater Ring is discontinued but can be joined via Boulevard Briand Aristide/Briand Aristidelaan, Avenue Eugène Ysaÿe/Eugène Ysayelaan and Avenue Théo Verbeeck/Théo Verbeecklaan. Then the Greater Ring resumes:

 Rue René Henry/René Henrystraat
 Rue de la Compétition
 Boulevard Maria Groeninckx De May/Maria Groeninckx De Maylaan
 Boulevard de la Grande Ceinture/Grote Ringlaan
 Boulevard Louis Mettewie/Louis Mettewielaan
 Avenue Emile Bossaert/Emile Bossaertlaan
 Avenue Jacques Sermon/Jacques Sermonlaan
 Avenue de Laeken/Lakenselaan
 Boulevard de Smet de Naeyer/De Smet de Naeyerlaan
 Avenue des Robiniers/Witte Acacialaan
 Avenue du Parc Royal/Koninklijk Parklaan

Public transport
The Greater Ring is extensively used by public transport. Between Boileau and Diamant, 4 underground tram stations (Boileau, Montgomery, Georges Henry and Diamant) are connected by a tunnel for trams, which lies under the Greater Ring. This tunnel is used by tram routes 7 and 25. Albert underground tram station is also located under the Greater Ring at the Albert crossroad, where the tram routes 3 and 4 join the Greater Ring, route 3 stopping 3 stops later at Churchill whereas route 4 leaves the Ring two stops later at Vanderkindere.

Tram route 7 (previously 23/24) actually starts at the Vanderkindere crossing and follows the Greater Ring up to Gros Tilleul (De Wand stop), only to leave the Greater Ring after having crossed the Royal Domain to end at Heysel. This makes it the route which drives the most along the Ring. Old route 24 also started at Vanderkindere and ran up to Princesse Elisabeth stop only to terminate at the next stop at Schaerbeek railway station. Route 25 joins the Ring at Buyl stop coming from Boondael railway station, follows it up to Meiser stop and terminates at Rogier metro station.

Bus route 49 follows the Ring on two occasions, first as it joins the Rue du Pont de Luttre at stop Wiels, coming from Brussels South railway station. It then leaves the Ring at stop Veeweyde metro station, to come back at stop Peterbos up to stop Leopold I.

Streets in Brussels